The 2015–16 season was Crewe Alexandra's 139th season in their history, their 92nd in the English Football League and fourth consecutive season in League One. Along with competing in League One, the club also participated in the FA Cup, League Cup and JP Trophy. The season covers the period from 1 July 2015 to 30 June 2016.

Transfers

Transfers in

Transfers out

Loans in

Squad statistics

Appearances and goals

Source: Soccerbase and 11v11.com
Numbers in parentheses denote appearances as substitute. Players with number struck through and marked  left the club during the playing season.

Top scorers
 	

Source: Soccerbase and 11v11.com

Disciplinary record

Source: Soccerbase and 11v11.com

Clean sheets

Source: 11v11.com (Ben Garratt)

Competitions

Pre-season friendlies
On 7 May 2015, Crewe Alexandra announced they would travel to Nantwich Town for a pre-season friendly on 19 July 2015. On 13 May 2015, a further six friendlies were announced against, Congleton Town, Alsager Town, Newcastle Town, Kidsgrove Athletic, Altrincham and Kirby Muxloe. On 18 June 2015, a friendly against Chester was announced.

League One

League table

Matches
On 17 June 2015, the fixtures for the forthcoming season were announced.

FA Cup

League Cup
On 16 June 2015, the first round draw was made, Crewe Alexandra were drawn at home against Preston North End.

Football League Trophy
On 5 September 2015, the second round draw was shown live on Soccer AM and drawn by Charlie Austin and Ed Skrein. Crewe will host Wigan Athletic.

Cheshire Senior Cup
On the Cheshire FA website the preliminary round details were announced, Crewe Alex will face Witton Albion.

References

Crewe Alexandra
Crewe Alexandra F.C. seasons